"Dreams" is the debut single of Irish rock band the Cranberries. It was originally released in September 1992 and later appeared on the band's debut album, Everybody Else Is Doing It, So Why Can't We? (1993). The song reached the top 50 of the US Hot 100 and the top 30 of the UK Singles Chart in early 1994. A 1990 demo version was released in Ireland only in the summer of that year under their initial band name, the Cranberry Saw Us. At the end of the song, the backing vocals are sung by Mike Mahoney, ex-boyfriend of Cranberries lead singer Dolores O'Riordan.

In 2017, the song was released as an acoustic, stripped-down version on the band's Something Else album.

Background
According to lead singer Dolores O'Riordan, "Dreams" was written for an early love; she explained, "I wrote that about my first love when I was living in Ireland ... It's about feeling really in love for the first time". The song was later released on a demo tape with "Linger" that helped generate excitement for the band.

In an interview for New Musical Express, guitarist Noel Hogan said of the song:

Critical reception
Upon the 1992 release, Ian Gittins from Melody Maker named "Dreams" Single of the Week. He complimented it as "intoxicating, beguiling, a gossamer waltz across sacred ground", and concluded, "So enjoy the delicate but profound delights of 'Dreams' now. The Cranberries may never be this good again." On the 1994 re-release, Alan Jones from Music Week wrote, "A very different track to the long-lasting "Linger", "Dreams" is a more uptempo piece, less melodic but still a good bet." Charles Aaron from Spin commented, "Sinéadish wails over the drumbeat from Modern English's "I Melt with You". Dope. But after enduring the video, I sure hope singer Dolores O'Riordan has more compelling dreams than trotting around with a white horse and digging up hunks in the countryside."

Music videos

There are three versions of the music video for the song. The first version features Dolores O'Riordan donning her original hairstyle that is seen on the Everybody Else Is Doing It, So Why Can't We? album cover. The video revolves around O'Riordan with the other band members flashing up throughout the video while she's sitting on in a chair with a cross as a back or a close up of her face and eyes. The video shows a mirrored image of O'Riordan to show she does the background vocals and towards the end the band members fade in and out constantly in front of O'Riordan.

The second version shows the Cranberries performing the song in a dimly lit aquatic-themed room interspersed with shots of geometric flowers hitting water. This video received high rotation on MTV's 120 Minutes in 1993 before the release of the band's next single, "Linger", and the re-release of "Dreams" worldwide.

The third version, directed by Nico Soultanakis which was most commonly shown in America and Ireland, shows the Cranberries performing the song in a nightclub. Afterward, Dolores O'Riordan heads out to a house where grave robbers dressed in black have placed a very large tree pile inside. Dolores bathes the tree pile in water and a man is revealed to be buried in the pile. The water frees him and in the final seconds of the video, the man awakens.

Track listings

 UK 7-inch and cassette single
 "Dreams" – 4:15
 "What You Were" – 3:41
Note: Both formats were re-released in 1994 and contain the same tracks

 UK 12-inch and CD single
 "Dreams" – 4:32 (4:15 on CD)
 "What You Were" – 3:41
 "Liar" – 2:21
Note: The CD was re-released in 1994 as the first part of a two-CD set and contains the same tracks

 UK CD2 (1994)
 "Not Sorry" (live at The Record Plant, Hollywood)
 "Wanted" (live at The Record Plant, Hollywood)
 "Dreams" (live at The Record Plant, Hollywood)
 "Liar" (live at The Record Plant, Hollywood)

 US CD single
 "Dreams" – 4:32
 "What You Were" – 3:41
 "Waltzing Back" (live at The Record Plant, Hollywood) – 4:01
 "Pretty" (live at The Record Plant, Hollywood) – 2:11

 US cassette single
 "Dreams" – 4:32
 "What You Were" – 3:41

 Canadian CD single
 "Dreams" – 4:32
 "Linger" – 4:34

Personnel
The Cranberries
 Dolores O'Riordan – lead and background vocals
 Noel Hogan – lead guitar, backing vocals
 Mike Hogan – bass guitar
 Fergal Lawler – drums

Additional musicians
 Mike Mahoney – additional vocals

Production
 Stephen Street – production, engineering
 Aidan McGovern – additional engineering

Charts

Certifications

Release history

Dario G version

English electronic music trio Dario G covered the song as "Dream to Me", with vocals provided by Ingrid Straumstøyl. Released on 22 January 2001 as the lead single from their second album, In Full Colour, this version reached number one in Romania and the top 10 in Austria, Germany, and the United Kingdom.

Track listings

 UK CD single
 "Dream to Me" (radio edit) – 3:09
 "Dream to Me" (Airscape remix) – 8:38
 "Dream to Me" (Warrior mix) – 7:48
 "Dream to Me" (video)

 UK 12-inch single
A. "Dream to Me" (Airscape remix) – 8:38
B. "Dream to Me" (Warrior mix) – 7:48

 UK cassette single
 "Dream to Me" (radio edit) – 3:09
 "Dream to Me" (Airscape remix) – 8:38

 European CD single
 "Dream to Me" (radio edit) – 3:09
 "Dream to Me" (Airscape remix) – 8:38

 European maxi-CD and Australian CD single
 "Dream to Me" (radio edit) – 3:09
 "Dream to Me" (Airscape remix) – 8:38
 "Dream to Me" (Warrior mix) – 7:48
 "Dream to Me" (Ian Wilkie mix) – 8:05

Charts

Weekly charts

Year-end charts

Release history

Other covers
 A Cantonese cover of the song, "Dream Lover", with backing vocals by herself, was a hit single for Chinese singer Faye Wong. It was included in her 1994 album Random Thoughts, and the song was prominently featured in the same year's film Chungking Express. Wong also recorded a Mandarin version, "Elude", on Sky. Both versions are popular in the Chinese media.
 In 2020, an Irish collective of female singers and musicians called Irish Women in Harmony, including Allie Sherlock, Caroline Corr, Erica Cody, Imelda May, Lisa Hannigan, Loah, Moya Brennan, Orla Gartland, Pillow Queens, Róisín O, RuthAnne, Saint Sister, Sibéal, Soulé, Una Healy and Wyvern Lingo recorded a version in aid of the charity Safe Ireland, which deals with domestic abuse which had reportedly risen significantly during the COVID-19 lockdown.
 Mexican singer Iran Castillo made a music video covering the song in 2020 with her sister Mónica Castillo and releasing it as a single.

See also
List of Romanian Top 100 number ones of the 2000s

References

1990 songs
1992 debut singles
1994 singles
2001 singles
The Cranberries songs
Faye Wong songs
Island Records singles
Number-one singles in Romania
Songs about dreams
Song recordings produced by Stephen Street
Songs written by Dolores O'Riordan
Songs written by Noel Hogan